Casey Roberts (May 9, 1901 – May 29, 1949) was an American set decorator. He was nominated for three Academy Awards in the category Best Art Direction. He was born in Illinois and died in Los Angeles, California.

Selected filmography
Roberts was nominated for three Academy Awards for Best Art Direction:
 Captains of the Clouds (1942)
 George Washington Slept Here (1942)
 Joan of Arc (1948)

References

External links

1901 births
1949 deaths
American set decorators
People from Illinois